Agios Pavlos (Greek: Άγιος Παύλος) is a village and a community in Chalkidiki, Greece. It is part of the municipality Nea Propontida, southeast of Thessaloniki. The community consists of the villages Agios Pavlos and Nea Irakleia (population in 2011 491 and 832 respectively). Nea Irakleia has a school, a church and a beach.

Geography
Farmlands cover the coastline around Nea Irakleia while the mountains cover the rest of the community. Tourism is very common during the summer months.

See also
List of settlements in Chalkidiki

References

 

Populated places in Chalkidiki